Goodview is a city in Winona County, Minnesota, United States. The population was 4,158 at the 2020 census.

Geography

Demographics

2010 census
As of the census of 2010, there were 4,036 people, 1,660 households, and 1,127 families living in the city. The racial makeup of the city was 96.0% White, 0.8% African American, 0.2% Native American, 1.8% Asian, 0.5% from other races, and 0.7% from two or more races. Hispanic or Latino of any race were 2.1% of the population.

There were 1,660 households, of which 30.2% had children under the age of 18 living with them, 52.0% were married couples living together, 11.9% had a female householder with no husband present, 4.0% had a male householder with no wife present, and 32.1% were non-families. 23.9% of all households were made up of individuals, and 6.8% had someone living alone who was 65 years of age or older. The average household size was 2.41 and the average family size was 2.85.

The median age in the city was 38.7 years. 22.4% of residents were under the age of 18; 9.6% were between the ages of 18 and 24; 26.5% were from 25 to 44; 28% were from 45 to 64; and 13.7% were 65 years of age or older. The gender makeup of the city was 49.4% male and 50.6% female.

2000 census
As of the census of 2000, there were 3,373 people, 1,375 households, and 966 families living in the city. The racial makeup of the city was 97.45% White, 0.39% African American, 0.15% Native American, 1.16% Asian, 0.27% from other races, and 0.59% from two or more races. Hispanic or Latino of any race were 0.95% of the population.

There were 1,375 households, out of which 34.3% had children under the age of 18 living with them, 57.7% were married couples living together, 9.9% had a female householder with no husband present, and 29.7% were non-families. 24.2% of all households were made up of individuals, and 7.6% had someone living alone who was 65 years of age or older.  The average household size was 2.45 and the average family size was 2.92.

In the city, the population was spread out, with 25.7% under the age of 18, 8.7% from 18 to 24, 30.1% from 25 to 44, 24.5% from 45 to 64, and 11.0% who were 65 years of age or older.  The median age was 36 years. For every 100 females, there were 94.3 males.  For every 100 females age 18 and over, there were 92.5 males.

The median income for a household in the city was $43,654, and the median income for a family was $52,837. Males had a median income of $36,788 versus $23,554 for females. The per capita income for the city was $22,488.  About 3.8% of families and 6.2% of the population were below the poverty line, including 7.7% of those under age 18 and 6.7% of those age 65 or over.

References

External links
City of Goodview

Cities in Minnesota
Cities in Winona County, Minnesota